Please Don't Eat the Daisies is an American sitcom that aired on NBC from September 14, 1965 to September 2, 1967. The series was based upon the 1957 book by Jean Kerr and the 1960 film starring Doris Day and David Niven.

The series ran for 58 half-hour episodes and starred Patricia Crowley and Mark Miller.  The show also features Dub Taylor, Clint Howard, Bonnie Franklin, and Ellen Corby in recurring appearances. Robert Vaughn and David McCallum appeared in the first-season episode "Say UNCLE" as Napoleon Solo and Illya Kuryakin from The Man from U.N.C.L.E., while Stefanie Powers appeared as April Dancer from The Girl from U.N.C.L.E. in a second-season episode. Patricia Crowley had appeared in the pilot episode of The Man from U.N.C.L.E.

Synopsis

Joan and Jim Nash are a married couple who live in an old, turreted house in Ridgemont, New York, with their four rambunctious sons (Kyle, Joel, and identical twins Trevor and Tracy), a very tolerant live-in maid, and an enormous Old English sheepdog named Ladadog. Jim is a college English professor. Joan – who abhors everything having to do with homemaking and housework – is a freelance newspaper columnist whose columns focus on the humorous side of family life. Joan tries to keep things organized, but her family can be demanding. Chaos breaks out regularly, and the antics of the boys, the dog, her husband, and the neighbors as well as her own indifference to domestic chores give her plenty of inspiration for her column, much to Jim's embarrassment.

Cast
 Pat Crowley as Joan Nash
 Mark Miller as Jim Nash
 Kim Tyler as Kyle Nash
 Brian Nash as Joel Nash
 Jeff Fithian as Trevor Nash
 Joe Fithian as Tracy Nash
 Shirley Mitchell as Marge Thornton
 King Donovan as Herb Thornton
 Dub Taylor as Ed Hewley
 Ned Glass as Mr Hastings
 Jeanne Arnold as Mrs Podesta
 Bill Quinn as Dean Carter
 Bonnie Franklin as Dorie

Broadcast history
In its first season, the show did fairly well in the ratings. It was scheduled on Tuesday nights opposite the second half of two veteran shows on prime time television, Rawhide on CBS and Combat! on ABC. For its second year, Please Don't Eat The Daisies was moved to Saturday nights where it faced brutal competition against the second half of The Jackie Gleason Show. The ratings fell and NBC canceled the series in the spring of 1967.

Episode list

Season 1: (1965–66)

Season 2: (1966–67)

External links

 
 
 Please Don't Eat the Daisies opening credits on YouTube

1965 American television series debuts
1967 American television series endings
1960s American sitcoms
English-language television shows
NBC original programming
Television series about families
Television series by MGM Television
Television series based on adaptations
Live action television shows based on films
Television shows based on books
Television shows set in New York (state)